Daniel Mark Hammond (born 6 April 1985) is an English professional footballer who last played for S.League club Woodlands Wellington as a central defender.

Career
Born in King's Lynn, Hammond played youth football in England with Norwich City and Cambridge United, before beginning his senior career with King's Lynn. While at King's Lynn, Hammond spent loan spells at Stamford, Wisbech Town and Diss Town.

After moving to Singapore with his girlfriend in 2007, Hammond has played for Young Lions, Woodlands Wellington, Balestier Khalsa, Singapore Armed Forces and Geylang United.

On 23 November 2012, Woodlands Wellington announced that he would not be retained for the 2013 season.

Career statistics

References

1985 births
Living people
Sportspeople from King's Lynn
Association football defenders
English footballers
Norwich City F.C. players
Cambridge United F.C. players
King's Lynn F.C. players
Stamford A.F.C. players
Wisbech Town F.C. players
Diss Town F.C. players
Woodlands Wellington FC players
Young Lions FC players
Balestier Khalsa FC players
Warriors FC players
Geylang International FC players
Singapore Premier League players
Expatriate footballers in Singapore